Evelyn Ruth Scott  (1935 – 21 September 2017) was an Indigenous Australian social activist and educator.

She began working in the Townsville Aboriginal and Torres Strait Islander Advancement League in the 1960s. She was actively involved in campaigning for the 1967 Constitutional Referendum.

In 1971, she joined the Federal Council for the Advancement of Aborigines and Torres Strait Islanders (FCAATSI) executive as a vice-president. She was a leader in the transformation of FCAATSI into an Indigenous-controlled organisation in 1973, with the support of Josie Briggs. She was active in the first national women's organisation, the National Aboriginal and Islander Council, formed in the early 1970s.

She became Chair of the Council for Aboriginal Reconciliation (CAR) in the late 1990s, at a challenging time when the federal government led by John Howard was cutting reconciliation funding.

Scott was inducted onto the Victorian Honour Roll of Women in 2001 and received the Centenary Medal in the same year. She was appointed Officer of the Order of Australia in the 2003 Australia Day Honours.

Scott was the mother of rugby league player Sam Backo.

Evelyn Scott School, in the Australian Capital Territory, was started in 2021.

Later life 
In 2015, Scott was a resident in a care facility in Cairns. Scott died on 21 September 2017 aged 81.  On 2 October 2017, Queensland Premier Annastacia Palaszczuk announced that a state funeral for Scott would be held in Townsville. On 6 October 2017, the state funeral was held at the Townsville Stadium and was attended by Premier Palaszczuk, Leeanne Enoch (the first Indigenous woman to serve as a minister in a Queensland Government) and many Indigenous community leaders. Senator Pat Dodson delivered a eulogy which described Scott's leading role in the 1967 referendum to recognise Indigenous Australians. Scott was the first Indigenous woman to receive a Queensland state funeral.

References

1935 births
2017 deaths
Australian indigenous rights activists
Women human rights activists
Australian women activists
Australian people of Vanuatuan descent
Officers of the Order of Australia
People from North Queensland
Recipients of the Centenary Medal
20th-century Australian educators
People from Townsville
Date of birth missing
20th-century Australian women